The Tsolyáni Language, Part I and The Tsolyáni Language, Part II are a pair of 1977 fantasy tabletop role-playing game supplements.

Contents
The Tsolyáni Language, Volume One is devoted to the basics of the Tsolyani language and includes discussion of pronunciation and grammar, while Volume Two is an English/Tsolyani to Tsolyani/English vocabulary.

History
Originally self published in 1978 through Richfield Printing. A second printing was published in 1981 by Dave Arneson’s Adventure Games, and included an cassette tape to demonstrate pronunciation. Tita’s House of Games reprinted the books in 1999 along with a compact disc version of the cassette. Finally in 2005 an online pdf edition was released without the audio.

Reception
Frederick Paul Kiesche III reviewed The Tsolyáni Language, Volumes I & II in Space Gamer No. 71. Kiesche commented that "These volumes are highly technical and not for casual reading.  Given Professor Barker's linguistic background, they are technically correct (and a little dry). They are not meant for every gamer or referee, but if you want to add an exceptional amount of realism to a game of EPT/S&G, this will prove to be an invaluable guide."

References

Fantasy role-playing game supplements
Role-playing game supplements introduced in 1977
Tékumel